The 2016 ITM Auckland SuperSprint was a motor racing event for Supercars, held on the weekend of 4 to 6 November 2016. The event was held at Pukekohe Park Raceway near Pukekohe, New Zealand, and consisted of four races at 100 kilometres in length. It was the 13th event of fourteen in the 2016 International V8 Supercars Championship and hosted Races 24, 25, 26 and 27 of the season. It was the eleventh running of the Auckland SuperSprint.

Report

Practice

Race results

Race 24

Qualifying

Race

Race 25

Qualifying

Race

Race 26

Qualifying

Race

Race 27

Qualifying

Race

Championship standings after the event 

Drivers' Championship standings

Teams' Championship standings

References 

ITM Auckland SuperSprint
2016 in New Zealand motorsport
ITM Auckland SuperSprint